The Senior men's race at the 1986 IAAF World Cross Country Championships was held in Colombier, Neuchâtel, Switzerland, at the Planeyse Colombier on March 23, 1986.   A report on the event was given in the Glasgow Herald and in the Evening Times.

Complete results, medallists, 
 and the results of British athletes were published.

Race results

Senior men's race (12 km)

Individual

Teams

Note: Athletes in parentheses did not score for the team result

Participation
An unofficial count yields the participation of 337 athletes from 50 countries in the Senior men's race.  This is in agreement with the official numbers as published.

 (8)
 (9)
 (2)
 (7)
 (9)
 (5)
 (7)
 (3)
 (8)
 (2)
 (6)
 (6)
 (9)
 (9)
 (8)
 (9)
 (8)
 (9)
 (2)
 (9)
 (9)
 (6)
 (8)
 (9)
 (5)
 (8)
 (6)
 (8)
 (7)
 (8)
 (8)
 (6)
 (9)
 (9)
 (3)
 (9)
 (9)
 (1)
 (7)
 (9)
 (9)
 (1)
 (8)
 (6)
 (9)
 (2)
 (9)
 (7)
 (1)
 (6)

See also
 1986 IAAF World Cross Country Championships – Junior men's race
 1986 IAAF World Cross Country Championships – Senior women's race

References

IAAF World Cross Country Championships
Senior men's race at the World Athletics Cross Country Championships